Phytobaenus is a genus of beetles belonging to the family Aderidae.

The species of this genus are found in Europe.

Species:
 Phytobaenus amabilis Sahlberg, 1834

References

Aderidae
Beetle genera